Club All Youth Linkage (Club AYL) is a Maldivian semi-professional football club based in Male, that competes in the Dhivehi League.

References

External links
Official fan page at Facebook

Football clubs in the Maldives